Bechir Mogaadi (born April 11, 1975) is a Tunisian footballer who plays for Zanaco FC.

Azerbaijan career statistics

References

External links
 

Tunisian footballers
Tunisian expatriate footballers
Tunisia international footballers
1975 births
Living people
Expatriate footballers in Chile
Expatriate footballers in Azerbaijan
Expatriate footballers in Spain
Expatriate footballers in Zambia
Zanaco F.C. players
ES Hammam-Sousse players
Étoile Sportive du Sahel players
Espérance Sportive de Tunis players
CD Numancia players
El Makarem de Mahdia players
FK Karvan players
AZAL PFK players
Club Deportivo Palestino footballers
Association football midfielders